The 1996–97 Iran 2nd Division football season.

References 
www.rsssf.com

League 2 (Iran) seasons
Iran
2